NGC 602 is a young, bright open cluster of stars located in the Small Magellanic Cloud (SMC), a satellite galaxy to the Milky Way.  It is embedded in a nebula known as N90.

Radiation and shock waves from the stars of NGC 602 have pushed away much of the lighter surrounding gas and dust that is N90, and this in turn has triggered new star formation in the ridges (or "elephant trunks") of the nebula. These even younger, pre-main sequence stars are still enshrouded in dust but are visible to the Spitzer Space Telescope at infrared wavelengths. The cluster is of particular interest because it is located in the wing of the SMC leading to the Magellanic Bridge. Hence, while its chemical properties should be similar to those of the rest of the galaxy, it is relatively isolated and so easier to study.

NGC 602 contains three main condensations of stars.  The central core is NGC 602a, with the compact NGC 602b 100 arc-seconds to the NNW.  NGC 602c is a looser grouping 11 arc-minutes to the NE, which includes the WO star AB8.

NGC 602 includes many young O and B stars and young stellar objects, with few evolved stars.  Ionisation in the nebula is dominated by Sk 183, an extremely hot O3 main sequence star visible as the bright isolated star at the centre of the Hubble image.

A number of other, more distant galaxies also appear in the background of the Hubble images of NGC 602, making for a "tantalizing" and "grand" view.

References

External links

NGC 602: Taken Under the "Wing" of the Small Magellanic Cloud
Jan 8, 2007 NASA/ESA HST news and photo release on N90 (at the heart of which lies NGC 602)
NASA/ESA video 'Zooming on NGC 602' (Hubble Space Telescope)
NGC 602 @ SEDS NGC objects pages\
"Progressive star formation in the young SMC cluster NGC 602" Carlson, L. R., et al., 2007 ApJL 665, 109 
"The Initial Mass Function of the Stellar Association NGC 602 in the Small Magellanic Cloud with Hubble Space Telescope ACS Observations" Schmalzl, M., et al. 2008 ApJ 681, 290
"NGC 602 Environment, Kinematics and Origins" Nigra, L., et al., 2008 PASP 120, 972

0602
Open clusters
Small Magellanic Cloud
Hydrus (constellation)
18260801